Atle Douglas (born 9 June 1968 in Oxford, England) is a retired Norwegian middle-distance runner who specialized in the 800 metres. He represented BFG Fana, SK Vidar, Bergen FIK, IL Gular and IL Norna-Salhus during his active career.

He finished eighth at the 1994 European Championships. He also competed at the 1992 and 1996 Summer Olympics as well as the World Championships in 1993 and 1995 without reaching the finals. He became Norwegian champion in the years 1987–1990, 1993, 1995 and 1998.

His personal best time was 1:43.69 minutes, achieved in September 1995 in Rieti. This places him second among Norwegian 800 m runners, only behind 1996 Olympic champion Vebjørn Rodal.

References

1968 births
Living people
Norwegian male middle-distance runners
Athletes (track and field) at the 1992 Summer Olympics
Athletes (track and field) at the 1996 Summer Olympics
Olympic athletes of Norway
English people of Scottish descent
British emigrants to Norway
Naturalised citizens of Norway
Norwegian people of Scottish descent